Khunik-e Olya (also Romanized as Khūnīk-e ‘Olyā; also known as Khūnīk, Khūnik Bāla, and Khūnīk-e Bālā) is a village in Shusef Rural District, Shusef District, Nehbandan County, South Khorasan Province, Iran. At the 2006 census, its population was 125, in 50 families.

References 

Populated places in Nehbandan County